Saraswati is an outdoor sculpture of the Hindu goddess of the same name, installed outside the Embassy of Indonesia in Embassy Row, Washington, D.C., in the United States.

Description and history
The work was created by multiple Balinese sculptors and installed in 2013. The  gold and white statue depicts the Hindu goddess Saraswati standing on a lotus with three young students at her feet, one of which is Barack Obama.

See also
 2013 in art
 Public image of Barack Obama

References

External links
 A Little Help from Saraswati (September 29, 2014), Embassy of the Republic of Indonesia

2013 establishments in Washington, D.C.
2013 sculptures
Cultural depictions of Barack Obama
Embassy Row
Hindu goddesses in art
Indonesia–United States relations
Monuments and memorials in Washington, D.C.
Monuments to Barack Obama
Outdoor sculptures in Washington, D.C.
Sculptures of African Americans
Sculptures of birds in the United States
Sculptures of children in the United States
Sculptures of goddesses
Sculptures of women in Washington, D.C.
Statues in Washington, D.C.
Statues of presidents of the United States